"The Succubus" (French: "") is an 1837 short story by Honoré de Balzac, from , about the 1271 trial of a succubus disguised as a woman.

References

External links

1837 short stories
Fiction set in the 1270s
Demons in written fiction
Short stories by Honoré de Balzac
Succubi in popular culture
Works set in the 13th century

fr:Les Cent Contes drolatiques